An Essay in Aid of a Grammar of Assent (commonly abbreviated to the last three words) is John Henry Newman's seminal book on the philosophy of faith. Completed in 1870, the book took Newman 20 years to write, he confided to friends.

Newman's aim was to show that the scientific standards for evidence and assent are too narrow and inapplicable in concrete life. He argued that logic and its conclusions are not transferable to real life decision making as such. As a result, it is inappropriate to judge the validity of assent in concrete faith by conventional logical standards because paper logic is unequal to the task. "Logic is loose at both ends," he said, meaning that the process of logic initially depends on restrictive assumptions and is thus unable to fit its conclusions neatly into real world situations.

Aim and content

The Grammar was an apologia for faith. Newman was concerned with defending faith as a legitimate product of rational human activity—that assent is not contrary to human nature. He wrote this book against the background of British Empiricism which restricted the strength and legitimacy of assent to the evidence presented for it. John Locke, David Hume and John Stuart Mill, a contemporary of Newman, were the primary Empiricists that Newman was engaged with philosophically.

The Grammar is divided into two sections. The first is entitled "Assent and Apprehension", which deals with believing what one does not understand. The second, entitled "Assent and Inference", addresses the issue of believing what cannot be absolutely proven.

Both parts deal with assent or belief. The first part discussed the relationship between assent and apprehension—what level of intelligent appropriation of a teaching is necessary to believe in that teaching. This section ultimately turns on a distinction between apprehension and understanding. Newman's view was that one can believe as long as one apprehends, even if one does not understand. For example, one may not understand the doctrine of the Trinity, i.e., resolve the individual propositions of the doctrine into one clear whole conception, yet legitimately believe it because apprehension is possible without understanding.

Apprehension, according to Newman, is simply an "intelligent acceptance of the idea or of the fact which a proposition enunciates." So while the regular unlearned Christian, or anyone for that matter, may not be able to conceive that God is one and three, the words of the propositions that define the doctrine are clear and intellectually accessible and assent may legitimately follow.

The second part further clarified assent by comparing it with inference. The key difference between assent and inference is that assent is unconditional and inference is conditional, i.e., dependent on other propositions or ideas and unable to stand by itself.

For Newman, inference described a proposition that is intrinsically dependent on other propositions. For instance, the statement, "Therefore, the car is red," is clearly dependent on antecedent propositions for its meaning and those propositions would need to be disclosed before one could meaningfully assent. This is an inferential statement as opposed to "The car in front of the house is red," which is an assertion that can be assented to because it can stand on its own.

There are three types of inferences: formal, informal and natural. Formal inference is logic in the deductive sense. For Newman, logic is indeed extremely useful especially in science and in society. However, its real-world applicability is very limited in that its usefulness is circumscribed by its initial assumptions. For Newman, to make logic work, human thought has to be trimmed to very specific and narrow meanings such that logical statements then lose real world applicability.

Informal inference is akin to calculus. In informal inference one reaches a conclusion by considering the accumulation of converging antecedent probabilities. Natural inference is when the individual, in a simple and whole process, grasps the antecedent conditions and conclusions instantaneously. For instance, if one sees smoke, one may instantly infer the presence of fire. Natural inference, in Newman's view, is related to experience or innate ability.

The second part of the Grammar is where Newman introduces the concept of the Illative Sense, which is for Newman the intellectual counterpart of Aristotle's phronesis. It is the faculty of the human mind that closes the logic-gap in concrete situations and thus allowing for assent. Logic/formal inference utilises dependable processes that lead to a certain and firm conclusion in the fields in which it is applied. However, Newman maintained that in concrete life formal incontrovertible proof in favour of a decision is not possible—the best one can achieve is converging probabilities in favour of a conclusion. For Newman it is impossible to attain the concrete existential equivalent of logical certainty. Thus, to close that gap between converging probabilities and full assent, one needs the aid of the Illative Sense to attain certitude in specific situations.

Newman recognised that there are dangers associated with using the Illative Sense. In using it one may become vulnerable to superstition and eccentricity. But superstition is held in check, Newman suggests, by the moral element in the act of faith, that is, holiness, obedience, and the sense of duty will safeguard faith from becoming mere superstition.

Chapter breakdown 

Part I Assent and Apprehension

 Modes of holding and apprehending Propositions
 Assent considered as Apprehensive
 The Apprehension of Propositions
 Notional and Real Assent
 Apprehension and Assent in the matter of Religion

Part II Assent and Inference

 Assent Considered as Unconditional
 Certitude
 Inference
 The Illative Sense
 Inference and Assent in the matter of Religion.

See also   
 Thomas Bayes  
 Bayes' theorem 
 Bayesian probability  
 Development of doctrine    
 Probabiliorism

Notes

References 

 
 
 
 
 
 Walgrave, O.P., J. H., Newman the Theologian: The Nature of Belief and Doctrine as Exemplified in His Life and Works. Translated by A. V. Littledale (London: Geoffrey Chapman, 1960).

External links
 HTML etext of the Grammar of Assent at Newmanreader.org

Philosophy books
Works by John Henry Newman